The Battle at Garden's Gate is the second studio album by American rock band Greta Van Fleet, released on April 16, 2021. The album's first single, "My Way, Soon", was released on October 9, 2020 and topped the Billboard Mainstream Rock chart in January 2021.

The album debuted at number 7 on the Billboard 200 and number 1 on the Top Hard Rock Albums and Top Rock Albums with first week sales of 43,000.

Background and recording
The band commenced on writing material for a second studio album directly after finishing their debut album, Anthem of the Peaceful Army, which released in October 2018. As early  as January 2019, bassist Sam Kiszka indicated that the album was scheduled for sometime in 2019 as well. Recording sessions occurred in a concentrated 2-month period in mid-2019. The album was recorded with musical producer Greg Kurstin, who at the time had worked with Foo Fighters on Concrete and Gold and Medicine at Midnight.

Themes and composition
Early 2019 commentary from the band on the album noted that it would thematically have a "more worldly" feel than their prior work, inspired by the band's seeing the world through touring. Additionally, they aimed to create "an evolution to their sound" after their prior album received a lot of commentary, both positive and negative, of being very similar to the work of other bands such as Led Zeppelin. Upon the reveal of the album's name of The Battle at Garden's Gate in late 2020, they expanded on the themes, noting that it was "definitely a biblical reference" but that the album expanded well beyond that, into the idea of "ancient civilizations" and "parallel universe[s]". The band explores the human experience, and how religion and war affect it. The album was described as more dark, cinematic, and complicated than their prior album. Seeing dark instances of poverty and famine while touring inspired its more dire sound.

Release and promotion
The band released their first single from the album, "My Way, Soon", in October 2020. The song was debuted and performed live on December 8 on The Late Show with Stephen Colbert, complete with costumes and stage setup similar to 1970s' music programs. A second song, "Age of Machine", was released in December 2020. In January, "My Way, Soon" topped the Billboard Mainstream Rock songs chart, their fifth song to top the chart.

Reception

The album was featured in multiple "Most Anticipated Albums of 2021" lists, including from publications Rolling Stone, Vulture, and Ultimate Classic Rock.

The guitar solo of "Age of Machine" was elected by Guitar Worlds readers as the best of 2021.

Track listing

Personnel
Greta Van Fleet
 Joshua Kiszka – vocals, background vocals
 Jacob Kiszka – guitar, backing vocals
 Samuel Kiszka – bass, keyboards, background vocals
 Daniel Wagner – drums, background vocals

Additional musicians
 Jacob Braun – cello (1, 3, 7, 8, 12)
 Alma Fernandez – viola (1, 3, 7, 8, 12)
 Charlie Bisharat – violin (1, 3, 7, 8, 12)
 Songa Lee – violin (1, 3, 7, 8, 12)

Technical
 Greg Kurstin – production, engineering
 Mark "Spike" Stent – mixing
 Julian Burg – engineering
 Alex Pasco – engineering 
 Matt Wolach – mixing assistance
 Matt Tuggle – recording assistance (1–8, 11, 12)
 Peter Luretig – recording assistance (1–8, 11, 12)
 Brian Rajaratnam – recording assistance (1–8, 11, 12)

Charts

Weekly charts

Year-end charts

References

2021 albums
Albums produced by Greg Kurstin
Greta Van Fleet albums
Republic Records albums